Terek is a village in Osh Region of Kyrgyzstan. It is part of the Kara-Kulja District. Its population was 1,261 in 2021.

Geography

References 

Populated places in Osh Region